The alpaca (Lama pacos) is a species of South American camelid mammal. It is similar to, and often confused with, the llama. However, alpacas are often noticeably smaller than llamas. The two animals are closely related and can successfully crossbreed. Both species are believed to have been domesticated from their wild relatives, the vicuña and guanaco. There are two breeds of alpaca: the Suri alpaca and the Huacaya alpaca.

Alpacas are considerably smaller than llamas, and unlike llamas, they were not bred to be working animals, but were bred specifically for their fiber. Alpaca fiber is used for making knitted and woven items, similar to sheep's wool. These items include blankets, sweaters, hats, gloves, scarves, a wide variety of textiles, and ponchos, in South America, as well as sweaters, socks, coats, and bedding in other parts of the world. The fiber comes in more than 52 natural colors as classified in Peru, 12 as classified in Australia, and 16 as classified in the United States.

Alpacas communicate through body language. The most common is spitting to show dominance when they are in distress, fearful, or feel agitated. Male alpacas are more aggressive than females, and tend to establish dominance within their herd group. In some cases, alpha males will immobilize the head and neck of a weaker or challenging male in order to show their strength and dominance.

In the textile industry, "alpaca" primarily refers to the hair of Peruvian alpacas, but more broadly it refers to a style of fabric originally made from alpaca hair, such as mohair, Icelandic sheep wool, or even high-quality wool from other breeds of sheep. In trade, distinctions are made between alpacas and the several styles of mohair and luster.

Background

The relationship between alpacas and vicuñas was disputed for many years. In the 18th and 19th centuries, the four South American lamoid species were assigned scientific names. At that time, the alpaca was assumed to be descended from the llama, ignoring similarities in size, fleece and dentition between the alpaca and the vicuña. Classification was complicated by the fact that all four species of South American camelid can interbreed and produce fertile offspring. The advent of DNA technology made a more accurate classification possible.

In 2001, the alpaca genus classification changed from Lama pacos to Vicugna pacos, following the presentation of a paper on work by Miranda Kadwell etal. on alpaca DNA to the Royal Society showing the alpaca is descended from the vicuña, not the guanaco.

Origin and domestication
Alpacas were domesticated thousands of years ago. The Moche people of Northern Peru often used alpaca images in their art. There are no known wild alpacas, and its closest living relative, the vicuña (also native to South America), is the wild ancestor of the alpaca.

The family Camelidae first appeared in Americas 40–45 million years ago, during the Eocene period, from the common ancestor, Protylopus. The descendants divided into Camelini and Lamini tribes, taking different migratory patterns to Asia and South America, respectively. Although the camelids became extinct in North America around 3 million years ago, it flourished in the South with the species we see today. It was not until 2–5 million years ago, during the Pliocene, that the genus Hemiauchenia of the tribe Lamini split into Palaeolama and Lama; the latter would then split again into Lama and Vicugna upon migrating down to South America.

Remains of vicuña and guanaco have been found throughout Peru for around 12,000 years. Their domesticated counterparts, the llama and alpacas, have been found mummified in the Moquegua valley, in the south of Peru, dating back 900 to 1000 years. Mummies found in this region show two breeds of alpacas. More precise analysis of bone and teeth of these mummies has demonstrated that alpacas were domesticated from the Vicugna vicugna. Other research, considering the behavioral and morphological characteristics of alpacas and their wild counterparts, seems to indicate that alpacas could find their origins in Lama guanicoe as well as Vicugna vicugna, or even a hybrid of both.

Genetic analysis shows a different picture of the origins of the alpaca. Analysis of mitochondrial DNA shows that most alpacas have guanaco mtDNA, and many also have vicuña mtDNA. But microsatellite data shows that alpaca DNA is much more similar to vicuña DNA than to guanaco DNA. This suggests that alpacas are descendants of the Vicugna vicugna, not of the Lama guanicoe. The discrepancy with mtDNA seems to be a result of the fact that mtDNA is only transmitted by the mother, and recent husbandry practices have caused hybridization between llamas (which primarily carry guanaco DNA) and alpacas. To the extent that many of today's domestic alpacas are the result of male alpacas bred to female llamas, this would explain the mtDNA consistent with guanacos. This situation has led to attempts to reclassify the alpaca as Vicugna pacos.

Breeds 
The alpaca comes in two breeds, Suri and Huacaya, based on their fibers rather than scientific or European classifications.

Huacaya alpacas are the most commonly found, constituting about 90% of the population. The Huacaya alpaca is thought to have originated in post-colonial Peru. This is due to their thicker fleece which makes them more suited to survive in the higher altitudes of the Andes after being pushed into the highlands of Peru with the arrival of the Spanish.

Suri alpacas represent a smaller portion of the total alpaca population, around 10%. They are thought to have been more prevalent in pre-Columbian Peru since they could be kept at a lower altitude where a thicker fleece was not needed for harsh weather conditions.

Behavior

Alpacas are social herd animals that live in family groups, consisting of a territorial alpha male, females, and their young ones. Alpacas warn the herd about intruders by making sharp, noisy inhalations that sound like a high-pitched bray. The herd may attack smaller predators with their front feet and can spit and kick. Their aggression towards members of the canid family (coyotes, foxes, dogs etc.) is exploited when alpacas are used as guard llamas for guarding sheep.

Alpacas can sometimes be aggressive, but they can also be very gentle, intelligent, and extremely observant. For the most part, alpacas are very quiet, but male alpacas are more energetic when they get involved in fighting with other alpacas. When they prey, they are cautious but also nervous when they feel any type of threat. They can feel threatened when a person or another alpaca comes up from behind them.

Alpacas set their own boundaries of "personal space" within their families and groups. They make a hierarchy in some sense, and each alpaca is aware of the dominant animals in each group. Body language is the key to their communication. It helps to maintain their order. One example of their body communication includes a pose named broadside, where their ears are pulled back and they stand sideways. This pose is used when male alpacas are defending their territory.

When they are young, they tend to follow larger objects and to sit near or under them. An example of this is a baby alpaca with its mother. This can also apply when an alpaca passes by an older alpaca.

Training
Alpacas are generally very trainable and usually respond to reward, most commonly in the form of food. They can usually be petted without getting agitated, especially if one avoids petting the head or neck. Alpacas are usually quite easy to herd, even in large groups. However, during herding, it is recommended for the handler to approach the animals slowly and quietly, as failing to do so can result in danger for both the animals and the handler.

Alpacas and llamas have started showing up in U.S. nursing homes and hospitals as trained, certified therapy animals. The Mayo Clinic says animal-assisted therapy can reduce pain, depression, anxiety, and fatigue. This type of animal therapy is growing in popularity, and there are several organizations throughout the United States that participate.

Spitting
Not all alpacas spit, but all are capable of doing so. "Spit" is somewhat euphemistic; occasionally the projectile contains only air and a little saliva, although alpacas commonly bring up acidic stomach contents (generally a green, grassy mix) and project it onto their chosen targets. Spitting is mostly reserved for other alpacas, but an alpaca will also occasionally spit at a human.

Spitting can result in what is called "sour mouth". Sour mouth is characterized by "a loose-hanging lower lip and a gaping mouth."

Alpacas can spit for several reasons. A female alpaca spits when she is not interested in a male alpaca, typically when she thinks that she is already impregnated. Both sexes of alpaca keep others away from their food, or anything they have their eyes on. Most give a slight warning before spitting by blowing air out and raising their heads, giving their ears a "pinned" appearance.

Alpacas can spit up to ten feet if they need to. For example, if another animal does not back off, the alpaca will throw up its stomach contents, resulting in a lot of spit.

Some signs of stress which can lead to their spitting habits include: humming, a wrinkle under their eye, drooling, rapid breathing, and stomping their feet. When alpacas show any sign of interest or alertness, they tend to sniff their surroundings, watch closely, or stand quietly in place and stare.

When it comes to reproduction, they spit because it is a response triggered by the progesterone levels being increased, which is associated with ovulation.

Hygiene
Alpacas use a communal dung pile, where they do not graze. This behaviour tends to limit the spread of internal parasites. Generally, males have much tidier, and fewer dung piles than females, which tend to stand in a line and all go at once. One female approaches the dung pile and begins to urinate and/or defecate, and the rest of the herd often follows. Alpaca waste is collected and used as garden fertilizer or even natural fertilizer.

Because of their preference for using a dung pile for excreting bodily waste, some alpacas have been successfully house-trained.

Alpacas develop dental hygiene problems which affect their eating and behavior. Warning signs include protracted chewing while eating, or food spilling out of their mouths. Poor body condition and sunken cheeks are also telltales of dental problems.

Sounds

Alpacas make a variety of sounds: 
 Humming: When alpacas are born, the mother and baby hum constantly. They also hum as a sign of distress, especially when they are separated from their herd. Alpacas may also hum when curious, happy, worried or cautious.
 Snorting: Alpacas snort when another alpaca is invading its space.
 Grumbling: Alpacas grumble to warn each other. For example, when one is invading another's personal space, it sounds like gurgling.
 Clucking: Similar to a hen's cluck, alpacas cluck when a mother is concerned for her cria. Male alpacas cluck to signal friendly behavior.
 Screaming: Their screams are extremely deafening and loud. They will scream when they are not handled correctly or when they are being attacked by a potential enemy.
 Screeching: A bird-like cry, presumably intended to terrify the opponent. This sound is typically used by male alpacas when they are in a fight over dominance. When a female screeches, it is more of a growl when she is angry.

Reproduction
Females are induced ovulators; meaning the act of mating and the presence of semen causes them to ovulate. Females usually conceive after just one breeding, but occasionally do have trouble conceiving. Artificial insemination is technically difficult, expensive and not common, but it can be accomplished. Embryo transfer is more widespread.

A male is usually ready to mate for the first time between two and three years of age. It is not advisable to allow a young female to be bred until she is mature and has reached two-thirds of her mature weight. Over-breeding a young female before conception is possibly a common cause of uterine infections. As the age of maturation varies greatly between individuals, it is usually recommended that novice breeders wait until females are 18 months of age or older before initiating breeding.

Alpacas can breed at any time throughout the year but it is more difficult to breed in the winter. Most breed during autumn or late spring. The most popular way to have alpacas mate is pen mating. Pen mating is when they move both the female and the desired male into a pen. Another way is paddock mating where one male alpaca is let loose in the paddock with several female alpacas.

The gestation period is, on average, 11.5 months, and usually results in a single offspring, or cria. Twins are rare, occurring about once per 1000 deliveries. Cria are generally between 15 and 19 pounds, and are standing 30 to 90 minutes after birth. After a female gives birth, she is generally receptive to breeding again after about two weeks. Crias may be weaned through human intervention at about six months old and 60 pounds, but many breeders prefer to allow the female to decide when to wean her offspring; they can be weaned earlier or later depending on their size and emotional maturity.

The average lifespan of an alpaca is between 15–20 years, and the longest-lived alpaca on record is 27 years.

Pests and diseases 
Cattle tuberculosis can also infect alpacas: Mycobacterium bovis also causes TB in this species worldwide. Krajewska‐Wędzina et al., 2020 detect M. bovis in individuals traded from the United Kingdom to Poland. To accomplish this they develop a seroassay which correctly identifies positive subjects which are false negative for a common skin test. Krajewska‐Wędzina et al. also find that alpacas are unusual in mounting a competent early-infection immune response. Bernitz et al., 2021 believe this to generalise to all camelids.

Habitat and lifestyle 

Alpacas can be found throughout most of South America. They typically live in temperate conditions in the mountains with high altitudes.

They are easy to care for since they are not limited to a specific type of environment. Animals such as flamingos, condors, spectacled bears, mountain lions, coyotes, llamas, and sheep live near alpacas when they are in their natural habitat.

Population 
Alpacas are native to Peru, but can be found throughout the globe in captivity. Peru currently has the largest alpaca population, with over half the world's animals. The population declined drastically after the Spanish Conquistadors invaded the Andes mountains in 1532, after which 98% of the animals were destroyed. The Spanish also brought with them diseases that were fatal to alpacas.

European conquest forced the animals to move higher into the mountains, which remained there permanently. Although alpacas had almost been wiped out completely, they were rediscovered sometime during the 19th century by Europeans. After finding uses for them, the animals became important to societies during the industrial revolution.

In popular culture 
Nuzzle and Scratch was a British children's television programme featuring two fictional alpacas that was first broadcast between 2008 and 2011.

Interest in alpacas grew as a result of Depp v. Heard, the 2022 trial in which Johnny Depp sued Amber Heard for defamation in Virginia after Heard wrote an op-ed saying she was a public victim of domestic violence. Depp testified, under oath, that he would not make another Pirates of the Caribbean film for "300 million dollars and a million alpacas".

Diet

Alpacas chew their food which ends up being mixed with their cud and saliva and then they swallow it. Alpacas usually eat 1.5% of their body weight daily for normal growth. They mainly need pasture grass, hay, or silage but some may also need supplemental energy and protein foods and they will also normally try to chew on almost anything (e.g. empty bottle). Most alpaca ranchers rotate their feeding grounds so the grass can regrow and fecal parasites may die before reusing the area. Pasture grass is a great source of protein. When seasons change, the grass loses or gains more protein. For example, in the spring, the pasture grass has about 20% protein while in the summer, it only has 6%. They need more energy supplements in the winter to produce body heat and warmth. They get their fiber from hay or from long stems which provides them with vitamin E. Green grass contains vitamin A and E.

Alpacas can eat natural unfertilized grass; however, ranchers can also supplement grass with low-protein grass hay. To provide selenium and other necessary vitamins, ranchers will feed their domestic alpacas a daily dose of grain to provide additional nutrients that are not fully obtained from their primary diet. Alpacas may obtain the necessary vitamins in their native grazing ranges.

Digestion
Alpacas, like other camelids, have a three-chambered stomach; combined with chewing cud, this three-chambered system allows maximum extraction of nutrients from low-quality forages. Alpacas are not ruminants, pseudo-ruminants, or modified ruminants, as there are many differences between the anatomy and physiology of a camelid and a ruminant stomach.

Alpacas will chew their food in a figure eight motion, swallow the food, and then pass it into one of the stomach's chambers. The first and second chambers (called C1 and C2) are anaerobic fermentation chambers where the fermentation process begins. The alpaca will further absorb nutrients and water in the first part of the third chamber. The end of the third chamber (called C3) is where the stomach secretes acids to digest food and is the likely place where an alpaca will have ulcers if stressed.

Poisonous plants
Many plants are poisonous to the alpaca, including the bracken fern, Madagascar ragwort, oleander, and some azaleas. In common with similar livestock, others include acorns, African rue, agave, amaryllis, autumn crocus, bear grass, broom snakeweed, buckwheat, ragweed, buttercups, calla lily, orange tree foliage, carnations, castor beans, and many others.

Fiber

Alpaca fleece is soft and possesses water and flame resistant properties, making it a valuable commodity.

Alpacas are typically sheared once per year in the spring. The quality of alpaca fiber is determined by how crimpy it is. Typically, the greater the number of small folds in the fiber, the greater the quality.

Prices
Alpacas were the subject of a speculative bubble between their introduction to North America in 1984 and the early 21st century. The price for American alpacas ranged from US$50 for a castrated male (gelding) to US$675,000 for the highest in the world, depending on breeding history, sex, and color. In 2006, researchers warned that the higher prices sought for alpaca breeding stock were largely speculative and not supported by market fundamentals, given the low inherent returns per head from the main end product, alpaca fiber, and prices into the $100s per head rather than $10,000s would be required for a commercially viable fiber production herd.

Marketed as "the investment you can hug" in television commercials by the Alpaca Owners and Breeders Association, the market for alpacas was almost entirely dependent on breeding and selling animals to new buyers, a classic sign of speculative bubbles in livestock. The bubble burst in 2007, with the price of alpaca breeding stock dropping by thousands of dollars each year thereafter. Many farmers found themselves unable to sell animals for any price, or even give them away.

However, this ratio differs from country to country and is highly dependent on the quality of pasture available (in many desert locations it is generally only possible to run one to three animals per acre due to lack of suitable vegetation). Fiber quality is the primary variant in the price achieved for alpaca wool; in Australia, it is common to classify the fiber by the thickness of the individual hairs and by the amount of vegetable matter contained in the supplied shearings.

Livestock

Alpacas need to eat 1–2% of body weight per day, so about two  bales of grass hay per month per animal. When formulating a proper diet for alpacas, water and hay analysis should be performed to determine the proper vitamin and mineral supplementation program. Two options are to provide free choice salt/mineral powder or feed a specially formulated ration. Indigenous to the highest regions of the Andes, this harsh environment has created an extremely hardy animal, so only minimal housing and predator fencing are needed. The alpaca's three-chambered stomachs allow for extremely efficient digestion. There are no viable seeds in the manure, because alpacas prefer to only eat tender plant leaves, and will not consume thick plant stems; therefore, alpaca manure does not need composting to enrich pastures or ornamental landscaping. Nail and teeth trimming are needed every six to twelve months, along with annual shearing.

Similar to ruminants, such as cattle and sheep, alpacas have only lower teeth at the front of their mouths; therefore, they do not pull the grass up by the roots. Rotating pastures is still important, though, as alpacas have a tendency to regraze an area repeatedly. Alpacas are fiber-producing animals; they do not need to be slaughtered to reap their product, and their fiber is a renewable resource that grows yearly.

Cultural presence 
Alpacas are closely tied to cultural practices for Andeans people. Prior to colonization, the image of the alpaca was used in rituals and in their religious practices. Since the people in the region depended heavily on these animals for their sustenance, the alpaca was seen as a gift from Pachamama. Alpacas were used for their meat, fibers for clothing, and art, and their images in the form of conopas.

Conopas take their appearance from the Suri alpacas, with long locks flanking their sides and bangs covering the eyes, and a depression on the back. This depression is used in ritual practices, usually filled with coca leaves and fat from alpacas and lamas, to bring fertility and luck. While their use was prevalent before colonization, the attempts to convert the Andean people to Catholicism led to the acquisition of more than 3,400 conopas in Lima alone.

The origin of alpacas is depicted in legend; the legend states they came to be in the world after a goddess fell in love with a man. The goddess’ father only allowed her to be with her lover if he cared for her herd of alpacas. On top of caring for the herd, he was to always carry a small animal for his entire life. As the goddess came into our world, the alpacas followed her. Everything was fine until the man set the small animal down, and the goddess fled back to her home. On her way back home, the man attempted to stop her and her herd from fleeing. While he was not able to stop her from returning, he was able to stop a few alpacas from returning. These alpacas who did not make it back are said to be seen today in the swampy lands in the Andes waiting for the end of the world, so they may return to their goddess.

See also

Alpaca fiber
Guanaco
Llama
 Skrjabinema – an intestinal parasite that infects the guanaco
Vicuña

References

External links

 International Alpaca Association (IAA)
 Alpaca Owners Association (AOA) (US)
 Alpaca Association of Australia (AAA) (AU)
 View the alpaca genome in Ensembl

 
Camelids
Mammals of the Andes
Mammals of Argentina
Mammals of Bolivia
Mammals of Chile
Mammals of Ecuador
Mammals of Peru
Animal hair products
Livestock
Articles containing video clips
Mammals described in 1758
Taxa named by Carl Linnaeus
Wool animals